Fog is a visible aerosol consisting of tiny water droplets or ice crystals suspended in the air at or near the Earth's surface. Fog can be considered a type of low-lying cloud usually resembling stratus, and is heavily influenced by nearby bodies of water, topography, and wind conditions. In turn, fog affects many human activities, such as shipping, travel, and warfare.

Fog appears when water vapor (water in its gaseous form) condenses. During condensation, molecules of water vapor combine to make tiny liquid water droplets that hang in the air. Sea fog, which shows up near bodies of saline water, is formed as water vapor condenses on bits of salt. Fog is similar to, but less transparent than, mist.

Definition 

The term fog is typically distinguished from the more generic term cloud in that fog is low-lying, and the moisture in the fog is often generated locally (such as from a nearby body of water, like a lake or the ocean, or from nearby moist ground or marshes).

Formation 

Fog begins to form when water vapor condenses into tiny water droplets that are suspended in the air. Some examples of ways that water vapor is added to the air are by wind convergence into areas of upward motion; precipitation or virga falling from above; daytime heating evaporating water from the surface of oceans, water bodies, or wet land; transpiration from plants; cool or dry air moving over warmer water; and lifting air over mountains. Water vapor normally begins to condense on condensation nuclei such as dust, ice, and salt in order to form clouds. Fog, like its elevated cousin stratus, is a stable cloud deck which tends to form when a cool, stable air mass is trapped underneath a warm air mass.

Fog normally occurs at a relative humidity near 100%. This occurs from either added moisture in the air, or falling ambient air temperature. However, fog can form at lower humidities, and can sometimes fail to form with relative humidity at 100%. At 100% relative humidity, the air cannot hold additional moisture, thus, the air will become supersaturated if additional moisture is added.

Fog commonly produces precipitation in the form of drizzle or very light snow. Drizzle occurs when the humidity of fog attains 100% and the minute cloud droplets begin to coalesce into larger droplets. This can occur when the fog layer is lifted and cooled sufficiently, or when it is forcibly compressed from above by descending air. Drizzle becomes freezing drizzle when the temperature at the surface drops below the freezing point.

The thickness of a fog layer is largely determined by the altitude of the inversion boundary, which in coastal or oceanic locales is also the top of the marine layer, above which the air mass is warmer and drier. The inversion boundary varies its altitude primarily in response to the weight of the air above it, which is measured in terms of atmospheric pressure. The marine layer, and any fog-bank it may contain, will be "squashed" when the pressure is high, and conversely, may expand upwards when the pressure above it is lowering.

Types 

Fog can form in a number of ways, depending on how the cooling that caused the condensation occurred.

Radiation fog is formed by the cooling of land after sunset by infrared thermal radiation in calm conditions with a clear sky. The cooling ground then cools adjacent air by conduction, causing the air temperature to fall and reach the dew point, forming fog. In perfect calm, the fog layer can be less than a meter thick, but turbulence can promote a thicker layer. Radiation fog occurs at night, and usually does not last long after sunrise, but it can persist all day in the winter months, especially in areas bounded by high ground. Radiation fog is most common in autumn and early winter. Examples of this phenomenon include tule fog.

Ground fog is fog that obscures less than 60% of the sky and does not extend to the base of any overhead clouds. However, the term is usually a synonym for shallow radiation fog; in some cases the depth of the fog is on the order of tens of centimetres over certain kinds of terrain with the absence of wind.

Advection fog occurs when moist air passes over a cool surface by advection (wind) and is cooled. It is common as a warm front passes over an area with significant snow-pack. It is most common at sea when moist air encounters cooler waters, including areas of cold water upwelling, such as along the California coast (see San Francisco fog).  A strong enough temperature difference over water or bare ground can also cause advection fog.

Fog formed by advection along the California coastline is propelled onto land by one of several processes. A cold front can push the marine layer coast-ward, an occurrence most typical in the spring or late fall. During the summer months, a low-pressure trough produced by intense heating inland creates a strong pressure gradient, drawing in the dense marine layer. Also, during the summer, strong high pressure aloft over the desert southwest, usually in connection with the summer monsoon, produces a south to southeasterly flow which can drive the offshore marine layer up the coastline; a phenomenon known as a "southerly surge", typically following a coastal heat spell. However, if the monsoonal flow is sufficiently turbulent, it might instead break up the marine layer and any fog it may contain. Moderate turbulence will typically transform a fog bank, lifting it and breaking it up into shallow convective clouds called stratocumulus.

Evaporation fog or steam fog forms over bodies of water overlain by much colder air; this situation can also lead to the formation of steam devils, which look like their dust counterparts.  Lake effect fog is of this type, sometimes in combination with other causes like radiation fog.  It tends to differ from most advective fog formed over land in that it is, like lake-effect snow, a convective phenomenon, resulting in fog that can be very dense and deep and looks fluffy from above.

Frontal fog forms in much the same way as stratus cloud near a front when raindrops, falling from relatively warm air above a frontal surface, evaporate into cooler air close to the Earth's surface and cause it to become saturated.  This type of fog can be the result of a very low frontal stratus cloud subsiding to surface level in the absence of any lifting agent after the front passes.

Ice fog forms in very low temperatures and can be the result of other mechanisms mentioned here, as well as the exhalation of moist warm air by herds of animals. It can be associated with the diamond dust form of precipitation, in which very small crystals of ice form and slowly fall. This often occurs during blue sky conditions, which can cause many types of halos and other results of refraction of sunlight by the airborne crystals.

Freezing fog, which deposits rime, is composed of droplets of supercooled water that freeze to surfaces on contact.

Precipitation fog (or frontal fog) forms as precipitation falls into drier air below the cloud, the liquid droplets evaporate into water vapor. The water vapor cools and at the dewpoint it condenses and fog forms.

Hail fog sometimes occurs in the vicinity of significant hail accumulations due to decreased temperature and increased moisture leading to saturation in a very shallow layer near the surface. It most often occurs when there is a warm, humid layer atop the hail and when wind is light. This ground fog tends to be localized but can be extremely dense and abrupt. It may form shortly after the hail falls; when the hail has had time to cool the air and as it absorbs heat when melting and evaporating.

Upslope fog forms when moist air is going up the slope of a mountain or hill (orographic lifting) which condenses into fog on account of adiabatic cooling, and to a lesser extent the drop in pressure with altitude.

Freezing conditions 
 occurs when liquid fog droplets freeze to surfaces, forming white soft or hard rime. This is very common on mountain tops which are exposed to low clouds. It is equivalent to freezing rain, and essentially the same as the ice that forms inside a freezer which is not of the "frostless" or "frost-free" type. The term "freezing fog" may also refer to fog where water vapor is super-cooled, filling the air with small ice crystals similar to very light snow. It seems to make the fog "tangible", as if one could "grab a handful".

In the western United States, freezing fog may be referred to as pogonip. It occurs commonly during cold winter spells, usually in deep mountain valleys.
The word pogonip is derived from the Shoshone word paγi̵nappi̵h, which means "cloud".
In The Old Farmer's Almanac, in the calendar for December, the phrase "Beware the Pogonip" regularly appears.
In his anthology Smoke Bellew, Jack London described a pogonip which surrounded the main characters, killing one of them.

The phenomenon is also extremely common in the inland areas of the Pacific Northwest, with temperatures in the  range. The Columbia Plateau experiences this phenomenon most years due to temperature inversions, sometimes lasting for as long as three weeks. The fog typically begins forming around the area of the Columbia River and expands, sometimes covering the land to distances as far away as LaPine, Oregon, almost  due south of the river and into south central Washington.

Frozen fog (also known as ice fog) is any kind of fog where the droplets have frozen into extremely tiny crystals of ice in midair. Generally, this requires temperatures at or below , making it common only in and near the Arctic and Antarctic regions. It is most often seen in urban areas where it is created by the freezing of water vapor present in automobile exhaust and combustion products from heating and power generation. Urban ice fog can become extremely dense and will persist day and night until the temperature rises. Extremely small amounts of ice fog falling from the sky form a type of precipitation called ice crystals, often reported in Utqiaġvik, Alaska. Ice fog often leads to the visual phenomenon of light pillars.

Topographical influences 

Up-slope fog or hill fog forms when winds blow air up a slope (called orographic lift), adiabatically cooling it as it rises, and causing the moisture in it to condense. This often causes freezing fog on mountaintops, where the cloud ceiling would not otherwise be low enough.

Valley fog forms in mountain valleys, often during winter. It is essentially a radiation fog confined by local topography, and can last for several days in calm conditions. In California's Central Valley, valley fog is often referred to as tule fog.

Sea and coastal fog 
Sea fog (also known as haar or fret) is heavily influenced by the presence of sea spray and microscopic airborne salt crystals.  Clouds of all types require minute hygroscopic particles upon which water vapor can condense. Over the ocean surface, the most common particles are salt from salt spray produced by breaking waves. Except in areas of storminess, the most common areas of breaking waves are located near coastlines, hence the greatest densities of airborne salt particles are there.

Condensation on salt particles has been observed to occur at humidities as low as 70%, thus fog can occur even in relatively dry air in suitable locations such as the California coast. Typically, such lower humidity fog is preceded by a transparent mistiness along the coastline as condensation competes with evaporation, a phenomenon that is typically noticeable by beachgoers in the afternoon. Another recently discovered source of condensation nuclei for coastal fog is kelp seaweed. Researchers have found that under stress (intense sunlight, strong evaporation, etc.), kelp releases particles of iodine which in turn become nuclei for condensation of water vapor, causing fog that diffuses direct sunlight.

Sea smoke, also called steam fog or evaporation fog, is the most localized form and is created by cold air passing over warmer water or moist land. It often causes freezing fog, or sometimes hoar frost.

Arctic sea smoke is similar to sea smoke, but occurs when the air is very cold. Instead of condensing into water droplets, columns of freezing, rising, and condensing water vapor is formed. The water vapor produces the sea smoke fog, and is usually misty and smoke-like.

Garúa fog near the coast of Chile and Peru, occurs when typical fog produced by the sea travels inland, but suddenly meets an area of hot air. This causes the water particles of fog to shrink by evaporation, producing a "transparent mist". Garua fog is nearly invisible, yet it still forces drivers to use windshield wipers because of deposition of liquid water on hard surfaces. Camanchaca is a similar, dense fog.

Visibility effects 

Depending on the concentration of the droplets, visibility in fog can range from the appearance of haze, to almost zero visibility. Many lives are lost each year worldwide from accidents involving fog conditions on the highways, including multiple-vehicle collisions.

The aviation travel industry is affected by the severity of fog conditions. Even though modern auto-landing computers can put an aircraft down without the aid of a pilot, personnel manning an airport control tower must be able to see if aircraft are sitting on the runway awaiting takeoff. Safe operations are difficult in thick fog, and civilian airports may forbid takeoffs and landings until conditions improve.

A solution for landing returning military aircraft developed in World War II was called Fog Investigation and Dispersal Operation (FIDO). It involved burning enormous amounts of fuel alongside runways to evaporate fog, allowing returning fighter and bomber pilots sufficient visual cues to safely land their aircraft. The high energy demands of this method discourage its use for routine operations.

Shadows 

Shadows are cast through fog in three dimensions. The fog is dense enough to be illuminated by light that passes through gaps in a structure or tree, but thin enough to let a large quantity of that light pass through to illuminate points further on. As a result, object shadows appear as "beams" oriented in a direction parallel to the light source. These voluminous shadows are created the same way as crepuscular rays, which are the shadows of clouds.  In fog, it is solid objects that cast shadows.

Sound propagation and acoustic effects 

Sound typically travels fastest and farthest through solids, then liquids, then gases such as the atmosphere. Sound is affected during fog conditions due to the small distances between water droplets, and air temperature differences.

Molecular effect: Though fog is essentially liquid water, the many droplets are separated by small air gaps. High-pitched sounds have a high frequency, which in turn means they have a short wavelength. To transmit a high frequency wave, air must move back and forth very quickly. Short-wavelength high-pitched sound waves are reflected and refracted by many separated water droplets, partially cancelling and dissipating their energy (a process called "damping"). In contrast, low pitched notes, with a low frequency and a long wavelength, move the air less rapidly and less often, and lose less energy to interactions with small water droplets. Low-pitched notes are less affected by fog and travel further, which is why foghorns use a low-pitched tone.

Temperature effect: A fog can be caused by a temperature inversion where cold air is pooled at the surface which helped to create the fog, while warmer air sits above it. The inverted boundary between cold air and warm air reflects sound waves back toward the ground, allowing sound that would normally radiate out escaping into the upper atmosphere to instead bounce back and travel near the surface. A temperature inversion increases the distance that lower frequency sounds can travel, by reflecting the sound between the ground and the inversion layer.

Record extremes 
Particularly foggy places include Hamilton, New Zealand and Grand Banks off the coast of Newfoundland (the meeting place of the cold Labrador Current from the north and the much warmer Gulf Stream from the south). Some very foggy land areas in the world include Argentia (Newfoundland) and Point Reyes (California), each with over 200 foggy days per year. Even in generally warmer southern Europe, thick fog and localized fog are often found in lowlands and valleys, such as the lower part of the Po Valley and the Arno and Tiber valleys in Italy; Ebro Valley in northeastern Spain; as well as on the Swiss plateau, especially in the Seeland area, in late autumn and winter. Other notably foggy areas include coastal Chile (in the south); coastal Namibia; Nord, Greenland; and the Severnaya Zemlya islands.

As a water source 
Redwood forests in California receive approximately 30–40% of their moisture from coastal fog by way of fog drip. Change in climate patterns could result in relative drought in these areas. Some animals, including insects, depend on wet fog as a principal source of water, particularly in otherwise desert climes, as along many African coastal areas. Some coastal communities use fog nets to extract moisture from the atmosphere where groundwater pumping and rainwater collection are insufficient. Fog can be of different type according to climatic conditions.

Artificial fog 

Artificial fog is man-made fog that is usually created by vaporizing a water- and glycol- or glycerine-based fluid. The fluid is injected into a heated metal block, and evaporates quickly. The resulting pressure forces the vapor out of a vent. Upon coming into contact with cool outside air, the vapor condenses in microscopic droplets and appears as fog. Such fog machines are primarily used for entertainment applications.

Historical references 

The presence of fog has often played a key role in historical events, such as strategic battles. One example is the Battle of Long Island (27 August 1776), when American general George Washington and his command were able to evade imminent capture by the British Army, using fog to conceal their escape. Another example is D-Day (6 June 1944) during World War II, when the Allies landed on the beaches of Normandy, France during fog conditions. Both positive and negative results were reported from both sides during that battle, due to impaired visibility.

Gallery

See also

Technology 
 Anti-fog
 Automotive lighting
 Decontamination foam
 Fog Investigation and Dispersal Operation (FIDO)
 Fog collection
 Foghorn
 Fog machine
 Fogging (photography)
 Fog lamp
 Head-up display
 Runway visual range
 Transmissometer

Weather 
 Cloud
 Fog season
 Haboob (sandstorm)
 Mist
 San Francisco fog
 Smoke
 Smog
 Whiteout (weather)
 Vog
 Stratus

Other 
 Multi-vehicle collision

References 

Under "[ ^ "Federal Meteorological Handbook Number 1: Chapter 8 – Present Weather" (PDF). Office of the Federal Coordinator for Meteorology. 1 September 2005. pp. 8–1, 8–2. Retrieved 9 October 2010.  ] "  ….

Actually use the following link- http://www.ofcm.gov/publications/fmh/FMH1/FMH1.pdf and proceed to Chapter 8, etc.

Further reading 
 Ahrens, C. (1991). Meteorology today: an introduction to weather, climate, and the environment. West Pub. Co. .
 Corton, Christine L. London Fog: The Biography (2015)

External links 

 Social & Economic Costs of Fog from "NOAA Socioeconomics" website initiative
 United States' current dense fog advisories from NOAA
 Current Western US fog satellite pictures from NOAA

 
Weather hazards to aircraft
Snow or ice weather phenomena
Road hazards
Clouds, fog and precipitation
Hazards of outdoor recreation